Retreat from the Sun is the third studio album by American alternative rock band That Dog. It was released on April 8, 1997, on DGC Records.

"Never Say Never", the album's lead single, peaked at number 27 on the Billboard Alternative Songs chart.

Legacy
On April 8, 2017, the reformed band celebrated the 20th anniversary of Retreat from the Suns release by performing the album in its entirety at the El Rey Theatre in Los Angeles. The same year, Consequence of Sound placed the album at number 48 on its retrospective list of the best albums of 1997.

Track listing

Personnel
Credits for Retreat from the Sun adapted from album liner notes.

That Dog
 Anna Waronker – vocals, guitar, piano
 Petra Haden – vocals, violin, strings
 Rachel Haden – vocals, bass guitar
 Tony Maxwell – drums, percussion, surf guitar on "Retreat from the Sun"

Additional musicians
 Charlotte Caffey – rhythm guitar on "Minneapolis", synthesizer on "Never Say Never"
 Alix Fournier – French horn on "Until the Day I Die"
 Tanya Haden – cello on "Never Say Never", "Every Time I Try" and "Until the Day I Die"
 Chick Wolverton – shaker and additional guitar on "Cowboy Hat"

Production
 That Dog – production
 Greg Calbi – mastering
 Chris Lord-Alge – mixing on "Never Say Never"
 John Paterno – engineering, mixing
 Brad Wood – production, mixing

Artwork and design
 Jesse Frohman – photography
 Francesca Restrepo – design

Charts

References

That Dog albums
1997 albums
albums produced by Brad Wood
Geffen Records albums